Dhok Allahdad Khan is a town in the Islamabad Capital Territory of Pakistan. It is located at 33° 15' 58N 73° 22' 5E with an altitude of 457 metres (1502 feet).

References 

Union councils of Islamabad Capital Territory